Safayyeh (formerly Ferdowsīyeh) is a city and capital of Ferdows District, in Rafsanjan County, Kerman Province, Iran.  At the 2016 census, its population was 2,478, in 758 families.  The name was changed from Ferdowsiyeh to Safayyeh when city status was bestowed upon the one-time village.

References

Populated places in Rafsanjan County

Cities in Kerman Province